Super is the thirteenth studio album by English synth-pop duo Pet Shop Boys. It was released on 1 April 2016 on the band's own label, x2, through Kobalt Label Services.  It is available on vinyl and compact disc along with a digital download.
The album debuted at number three on the UK Albums Chart. Lead single "The Pop Kids" reached number one on the UK Physical Singles Chart and narrowly missing out on the top 100 in the main chart.

Promotion
The album's release was announced on the band's website and social media pages on 21 January 2016, and was made available for pre-order via the iTunes Store on the same day. Those who pre-ordered Super received an instant download of the album's first track, "Inner Sanctum". Additionally, the band announced a four-performance residency at the Royal Opera House, scheduled for July 2016. The album's opening track, "Happiness", was released as a second teaser track on 23 March 2016. The video for "Twenty-something" was released on 10 May 2016.

As well as this, a pop-up shop was opened in London between 1 and 3 April 2016 to promote the release of the album.

Singles
"The Pop Kids" was released as the album's lead single on 16 February 2016. A CD single and a digital extended play was released on 18 March 2016, and features two remixes of "The Pop Kids" and two new tracks, "In Bits" and "One-hit Wonder". A white vinyl 12" of "The Pop Kids" was released on May 27. It features five remixes of the song.

On 24 June "Twenty-something" was released as the album's second single on CD and download, featuring the single edit, two new tracks "The White Dress" and "Wiedersehen", and two remixes.

On 22 July "Inner sanctum" was released on 12-inch vinyl and to celebrate their sold out shows at the Royal Opera House in London. The 4-track vinyl release featured the Carl Craig C2 Juiced RMX, two demo versions of the song and the album version. The Carl Craig remix was also released digitally.

On 16 September "Say It to Me" was released digitally and on CD. Like "The Pop Kids" there were two separate digital bundles. The first includes an alternate mix of the song, as well as two new tracks, "A cloud in a box" and "The dead can dance". The second bundle includes remixes by Tom Demac, Real Lies, and Offer Nissim. A 12" vinyl format was released a week later. The song entered the US Billboard Dance Chart at number 31 on 21 October. On 10 December the song reached number four. No promotional video was created for "Say It to Me" and it remains the only single not performed on their 2016 Super Tour.

Originally, "Burn" was planned as the fourth and final single, however, these plans were cancelled following the Ghost Ship warehouse fire.

On 1 April 2017 a three-track CD of "Undertow" was released exclusively with orders of the new Annually book. A four-track vinyl 12-inch was released commercially on 21 April, the same day as the three track digital download. The CD and digital download contains new remixes of "Undertow" and "Burn" by Tuff City Kids and Baba Stiltz respectively, as well as a new studio version of "Left to my own devices". The vinyl single includes these three tracks and adds "Undertow" (Tuff City Kids dub).

Reception

Critical reception

Super received generally favorable reviews from music critics.

Commercial performance
The album debuted at number three on the UK Albums Chart, selling 16,953 copies in its first week, becoming their 13th consecutive top 10 studio album. In the United States, Super debuted at number 58 on the Billboard 200 with first-week sales of 10,000 copies. It also debuted at number one on Billboards Dance/Electronic Albums chart, becoming Pet Shop Boys' first number-one album on the chart since Disco 3 (2003).

Track listing

Personnel
 Pet Shop Boys - performers and programming
 Stuart Price - production, mixing and additional programming
 Jessica Freedman - additional vocals on "Undertow"
 Nayana Holley - additional vocals on "Burn"

Charts

Weekly charts

Year-end charts

Sales

References

2016 albums
Albums produced by Stuart Price
Pet Shop Boys albums